The Rainbow Bluff Expedition took place on December 9, 1864 during the American Civil War. The Confederate water mines caused the Union naval force to cancel the expedition.

The Expedition
On 9 December, an expedition, which included the gunboat USS Wyalusing, moved farther up the Roanoke to capture Rainbow Bluff and a Confederate ram, rumored to be under construction at Halifax, North Carolina. While anchoring near Jamesville, North Carolina, Otsego, another gunboat, struck two torpedoes (mines) and sank up to her gun deck. Bazely, a tug, moved alongside Otsego to offer assistance, but she, too, struck a torpedo and sank immediately. Wyalusing and the remainder of the expedition left the two partially sunken ships under the protection of their own unsubmerged guns and headed upriver, cautiously dragging for torpedoes as they went. By the time they had reached the point of attack, the Confederate positions at Rainbow Bluff had been so well reinforced and the approaches so heavily strewn with torpedoes that the Union ships had to abandon the enterprise. Wyalusing and her consorts returned to Plymouth on 28 December 1864 and resumed blockade and amphibious support duties.

Raids of the American Civil War
Wilmington campaigns
Battles of the Eastern Theater of the American Civil War
Naval battles of the American Civil War
Confederate victories of the American Civil War
Dare County, North Carolina
Conflicts in 1864
1864 in North Carolina
Riverine warfare
Military operations of the American Civil War in North Carolina
December 1864 events